Jacques Clinchamps de Malfilâtre (8 October 1732 – 6 March 1767) was a French poet.

Works
Le Soleil fixe au milieu des planètes, 1759
Narcisse dans l’île de Vénus, 1769 (poem in 4 chants, published posthumously)
Le Bonheur
Le Génie de Virgile Paris, Maradan, 1810

French poets
1732 births
1767 deaths
French male poets